The Metronit ( Arabic: مترونيت), also spelled Matronit, is a bus rapid transit (BRT) system in Haifa, Israel.

One Metronit line, the Red Line, operates during the weekend, or Sabbath, i.e. on Friday and Saturday, which is almost unique in Israel - as of 2022, only in a handful of cities in Israel, Haifa among them, do public buses also offer service on Sabbath, mainly because they have a mixed population of Jews and non-Jews (Israeli Arabs). Other towns and cities in Israel, that are only or overwhelmingly inhabited by Israeli Arabs, have public transportation seven days a week.

Overview

Name 
The name, Metronit, was among some 500 suggestions submitted by the public in a prize-winning competition. Metronit was chosen for several reasons. The name itself was deemed to be easily expressed, catchy and unique. The Hebrew word, "Matronit" - meaning "respectable woman" or "lady" in Hebrew - was felt to convey a feeling of elegance and respectability. The prefix "Metro-" implies an efficient metropolitan rapid transportation system; the trailing "-it" is in line with Haifa's existing Carmelit funicular subway and the Shkhunatit internal neighbourhood minibus system.

Vehicles 
The Metronit consists of 120 18.75-meter long high-capacity buses on three routes, with a capacity of 120-140 passengers per bus. Some of the buses operate with hybrid engines (six Phileas buses manufactured by APTS) and are currently being evaluated for more widespread use. The rest of the buses are conventional MAN Lion's City GL Diesel powered buses.

The Metronit is unique in Israel in that it uses bi-articulated buses on specific routes. The choice of this mode of transport was due to the advantage of limited damage to the environment during construction, increased capacity on existing roads, and reduced operating costs compared to a standard bus or light rail line.

Construction 
The Metronit project was developed by Yefe Nof, a company owned by the City of Haifa which is involved in planning public transportation, infrastructure, and other building projects in the Haifa metropolitan area. A tender for its operation was published in September 2009 with the original intention that the system be completed by Fall 2012. On August 4, 2010, it was announced that Dan won the tender to operate the system for 12 years. The cost of the system is estimated at 1.5 billion NIS (approximately $400 million US).

Commencement of operations 

The Metronit began testing on August 2, 2013, and passenger operations commenced on August 16, 2013. As the first BRT system in Israel, there were initially many operational problems, caused mainly by a lack of priority at traffic lights, insufficient bus drivers and more passengers than anticipated. To promote the service, there was initially a period of free ridership that ended on December 23, 2013.

In May 2015, the daily ridership on the Metronit was 92,000 - with a total of 30 million passengers using the system in the first year.

In October 2021, Superbus took over operations of Metronit from Dan North.

Lines
There are currently five Metronit lines. The first operates from the Krayot Central Bus Station to Hof HaCarmel. The second from Kiryat Ata to Bat Galim. The third from Krayot Central Bus Station to Hadar HaCarmel. The fourth operates like the first line, but runs via the Carmel Tunnels instead of HaHagana boulevard unlike the first line. And the fifth operates from Yagur to Hadar HaCarmel, on weekends, a different route labled 5א operates to Bat Galim instead.

See also
 Carmelit
 Haifa Cable Car

References

External links
 Metronit official website
 Yefeh Nof profile of the project 
 News report about choosing the name 

Bus rapid transit
Transport in Haifa
Public transport in Israel